The Smite River is a river of the Canterbury region of New Zealand's South Island. It flows west from the Taylor Range to feed Lake Stream, the outflow of Lake Heron, which is an upper part of the Rakaia River system.

See also
List of rivers of New Zealand

References

Rivers of Canterbury, New Zealand
Rivers of New Zealand